Internationale Deutsche Schule Paris (iDSP) is a German international school in Saint-Cloud, France, in the Paris metropolitan area. The school serves levels kindergarten through Sekundarstufe II.

On 23 October 1958 the first stone for the school was laid. On 3 November of that year the school first opened in three YMCA-owned rooms in the 16th arrondissement of Paris, in proximity to Trocadéro. The school initially only had gymnasium classes. On 1 December 1959 the school moved into rented rooms in a villa in Neuilly-sur-Seine. The primary school opened on 1 March 1960. The primary classes were initially held in another location in the 16th arrondissement. In 1961 all levels of school moved to the current location, a villa in Saint-Cloud. The West German government had acquired the property.

Gallery

See also
 List including the French international schools in Germany

References

External links

 Internationale Deutsche Schule Paris
  Internationale Deutsche Schule Paris
  Internationale Deutsche Schule Paris

German international schools in France
Schools in Hauts-de-Seine
Lycées in Hauts-de-Seine
International schools in Île-de-France